, or officially  is a district of Chiyoda, Tokyo, Japan, consisting of 1-chōme and 2-chōme. As of April 1, 2007, the district's population is 543.

Awajichō is located in the northern part of Chiyoda. It borders Soto-Kanda to the north, Kanda-Sudachō to the east, Kanda-Ogawamachi to the south, and Kanda-Surugadai to the west.

Companies based in Awajichō
DIC Corporation, a global chemical company is headquartered in the district.

Education
 operates public elementary and junior high schools. Shōhei Elementary School (千代田区立昌平小学校) is the zoned elementary school for Kanda-Awajichō 1-2 chōme. There is a freedom of choice system for junior high schools in Chiyoda Ward, and so there are no specific junior high school zones.

References

Districts of Chiyoda, Tokyo